Norbert Alblas (born 12 December 1994) is a Dutch professional footballer who plays for Eredivisie club Excelsior as a goalkeeper.

Club career

Ajax
On 8 August 2013, Alblas signed a one-year contract with Ajax, with an option of a one-year extension. He made his professional debut for Jong Ajax in an Eerste Divisie match against Fortuna Sittard on 16 August 2014. On 27 October 2014, a day before the KNVB Cup match against SV Urk, Ajax manager Frank de Boer announced that Alblas was part of the first-team match squad. This was the first time for Alblas that he was included in the first team. 

In a match against RKC Waalwijk for Jong Ajax, Alblas was forced off after having torn his anterior cruciate ligament, which meant that he was out for the rest of 2015. Despite his injury, Ajax reached an agreement with Alblas at the end of May 2015 about the extension of his contract. His contract, which ran until 30 June 2015 was extended for one season. After 14 months of injury, he made his comeback in early-February 2016 in a friendly between Jong Ajax and Ajax Amateur which ended in a 3–3 draw. His official return to the pitch came late – mainly because third goalkeeper André Onana was often preferred as the starter for Jong Ajax – on 19 August 2016. On that day, Jong Ajax played a home match against Den Bosch, where Alblas was the team captain. In January 2017 it was announced that goalkeeper Tim Krul, at that time on loan with Ajax, would leave for AZ. As a result, Alblas became third goalkeeper in the first team of Ajax. In the 2017–18 season, Alblas won the Eerste Divisie with Jong Ajax. Afterwards, his contract expired and he left the club.

NEC
On 7 August 2018, Alblas signed a contract with NEC Nijmegen for two seasons with an option for two more seasons. He made his debut for the club on 31 August in a 1–0 win at home against Dordrecht. On 28 September 2018, Alblas injured his knee in a league match in the Eerste Divisie at home against Go Ahead Eagles and was replaced by Marco van Duin. He resumed practice in January 2019 but suffered a torn cruciate ligament after a week. Alblas did not play again for NEC and when the club did not exercise the option in his contract, his contract was set to expire in mid-2020. On 16 June, he signed a new one-year contract with an option for another season. Alblas started the 2020–21 season as the first goalkeeper, in favor of Mattijs Branderhorst. In the middle of the season, Alblas became second keeper again after some errors. On 23 May 2021, Alblas won promotion with NEC to the Eredivisie, by beating NAC Breda 2–1 in the final of the play-offs.

TOP Oss
After having played three seasons for NEC, Alblas signed with TOP Oss on 25 June 2021. He made his debut on 6 August, keeping a clean sheet in a 1–0 away win over Excelsior.

Excelsior
On 31 August 2022, Alblas signed a one-season contract with recently promoted Eredivisie club Excelsior. He was assigned as backup goalkeeper to starter Stijn van Gassel for the 2022–23 season. He made his Excelsior debut on 19 October in a 5–1 victory in the KNVB Cup against MVV Maastricht.

Career statistics

Club

Honours
Ajax
UEFA Europa League runners-up: 2016–17

Jong Ajax
Eerste Divisie: 2017–18

References

External links

1994 births
Living people
Sportspeople from Amstelveen
Dutch footballers
Netherlands youth international footballers
Association football goalkeepers
AFC Ajax players
Jong Ajax players
NEC Nijmegen players
TOP Oss players
Excelsior Rotterdam players
Eerste Divisie players
Footballers from North Holland